The Book of Faith (Arabic: Kitab al Iman, كتاب الإيمان) is a book on the Islamic articles of faith written by the 13th century Islamic scholar Ibn Taymiyyah.

See also
Ibn Taymiyyah

References

Sunni literature
Islamic theology books
Books by Ibn Taymiyyah